Éric Molinié (30 November 1960 – 21 December 2022) was a French businessman. He served as secretary-general of Dalkia, an energy company and subsidiary of Électricité de France (EDF).

Biography
Disabled from birth, Molinié studied at the Lycée Hoche in Versailles where he received his Baccalauréat and was later admitted to HEC Paris (class of 1982). He then became an advisor to EDF's chairman on disability, then economic issues, and was later director of sustainable development.

Molinié twice served as a member of the social affairs section of the French Economic, Social and Environmental Council and a rapporteur for a study on French public hospitals. In 2005, he received the Prix Guy Crescent for his actions in support of people with disabilities.

Molinié was president of the SAMU Social of Paris from 12 October 2011 to 7 October 2013. In 2016, he became a member of the board of directors of the International Movement ATD Fourth World France. In 2018, he became secretary-general of Dalkia and was one of the few people in France to hold a senior corporate position.

Molinié died on 21 December 2022, at the age of 62.

Decorations
Knight of the Legion of Honour
Officer of the Ordre national du Mérite (2011)

References

1960 births
2022 deaths
French businesspeople
Lycée Hoche alumni
HEC Paris alumni
Businesspeople from Paris
Électricité de France people
Chevaliers of the Légion d'honneur
Officers of the Ordre national du Mérite